The Giro d'Italia is an annual road bicycle race held in May. Established in 1909 by newspaper La Gazzetta dello Sport, the Giro is one of cycling's three "Grand Tours"; along with the Tour de France and the Vuelta a España. The race usually covers approximately 3,500 kilometres (2,200 mi), passing through Italy and neighbouring countries such as France. The race is broken into day-long segments, called stages. Individual finishing times for each stage are totalled to determine the overall winner at the end of the race. The course changes every year, but has traditionally finished in Milan.

The rider with the lowest aggregate time at the end of each day is leader of the general classification, and since 1931 wears a pink jersey. Other classifications have also been added, and sometimes removed; the leaders of some of these classifications were also indicated with jerseys, whose colours have varied over the years. As of 2011, the red jersey is worn by the leader of the points classification; the green jersey is worn by the leader of the mountains classification and the white jersey is worn by the leader of the young rider classification.

Alfredo Binda, Fausto Coppi and Eddy Merckx have the most Giro victories, each of them having won the competition five times. Coppi is the youngest winner of the Giro; he was 20 years, 158 days old when he won the 1940 Giro d'Italia. The oldest winner of the Giro is Fiorenzo Magni, who was 34 years old, 180 days when he won the 1955 Giro d'Italia. Italian cyclists have won the most Giros; 41 cyclists have won 68 Giros between them. Belgian cyclists are second with seven victories, and French riders are third with six wins.

History
In 1909 the newspaper La Gazzetta dello Sport established the Giro d'Italia, inspired by the success of the Tour de France, which started in 1903. The first Giro was won by Luigi Ganna, while Carlo Galetti won the two following Giros. In 1912, there was no individual classification, instead, there was only a team classification, which was won by Team Atala. The 1912 Giro is the only time the competition has not had an individual classification. From 1914 onwards the scoring format was changed from a points-based system to a time-based system, in which the cyclist who had the lowest aggregate time at the end of the race would win. The Giro was suspended for four years from 1915 to 1918, due to the First World War. Costante Girardengo was the winner of the first Giro after the war in 1919.

The dominant figure in the 1920s was Alfredo Binda, who won his first Giro in 1925 and followed this up with another victory in 1927, in which he won 12 of the 15 stages. Victory in 1929 came courtesy of eight successive stage wins. At the height of his dominance Binda was called to the head office of La Gazzetta dello Sport in 1930; the newspaper accused him of ruining the race and offered him 22,000 lira to be less dominant, which he refused. Binda won five Giros before he was usurped as the dominant cyclist by Gino Bartali. Nicknamed the "Iron Man of Tuscany" for his endurance, Bartali won two Giros during the 1930s, in 1936 and 1937. Bartali's dominance was challenged in 1940, the last Giro before the Second World War, when he was defeated by his 20-year-old teammate Fausto Coppi.

The rivalry between Bartali and Coppi intensified after the war. Bartali won his last Giro in 1946, with Coppi winning his second the following year. Coppi won a further three Giros and in 1952 he became the first cyclist to win the Tour de France and Giro in the same year. Swiss Hugo Koblet became the first non-Italian to win the race in 1950. No one dominated the tour during the 1950s, Coppi, Charly Gaul and Fiorenzo Magni each won two Giros during the decade. The 1960s were similar, five-time Tour de France winner Jacques Anquetil won in 1960, and 1964, while Franco Balmamion won successive Giros in 1962 and 1963.

Belgian Eddy Merckx was the dominant figure during the 1970s. His first victory came in 1968; another triumph in 1970 was followed by three successive victories from 1972 to 1974, which is the record for the most successive victories in the Giro. Felice Gimondi was victorious in 1976 winning his third Giro. Belgians Michel Pollentier and Johan De Muynck won the two subsequent Giros in 1977 and 1978. In 1980, Frenchman Bernard Hinault who up to this point had won two Tours de France, became France's first winner since Anquetil in 1964. He would win another two Giros in 1982 and 1985.

Stephen Roche was victorious in 1987, a year in which he also won the Tour and the UCI Road World Championship. American Andrew Hampsten became the first non-European winner the following year, and Laurent Fignon was victorious in 1989. Spaniard Miguel Indurain, winner of five Tours, won successive Giros in 1991 and 1992. Three time winner of the Vuelta a España, Tony Rominger was victorious in 1995, defeating the previous winner Evgeni Berzin. Marco Pantani was the winner in 1998, a year in which he completed the Tour and Giro double, Ivan Gotti won the previous Giro in 1997 and the subsequent one in 1999.

Stefano Garzelli won the Giro in 2000. Gilberto Simoni was the winner in 2001 and 2003, with Paolo Savoldelli victorious in 2002. Simoni was denied a third victory in 2004, when he was beaten by teammate Damiano Cunego. Salvodelli won his second Giro in 2005, beating Simoni by 28 seconds. Ivan Basso was the victor in 2006, Danilo di Luca won in 2007, though the tour was marred by doping allegations. Basso returned after a doping suspension to regain his title in 2010. Contador was the victor at the podium ceremony in Milan, but he was later stripped of the title after he was found guilty of doping in the 2010 Tour de France. Runner-up Michele Scarponi was awarded the victory.

Ryder Hesjedal became the first Canadian to win the Giro in 2012, beating Joaquim Rodríguez by 16 seconds. After gaining the lead after the eighth stage, Vincenzo Nibali won two more stages to help consolidate his lead and win the 2013 edition. Colombian Nairo Quintana became the first rider from South America to win the Giro in 2014. The following year Contador won the Giro for the second time. Nibali won his second Giro in 2016; he finished 52 seconds ahead of second-placed Esteban Chaves. In 2017, Tom Dumoulin became the first Dutchman to win the Giro, finishing only 31 seconds ahead of Quintana.  A year later, Chris Froome won the 2018 Giro, becoming the first British rider to win the race. He finished 46 seconds ahead of defending champion Dumoulin, mounting a comeback in the final week which included an   solo victory on stage 19. Richard Carapaz became the first Ecuadorian to win a Grand Tour when he won in 2019. British rider, Tao Geoghegan Hart, was the winner of the 2020 Giro. He won the race by 39 seconds after entering the final stage of the race, a time trial, level with runner-up, Jai Hindley. Egan Bernal won the 2021 Giro, while Hindley won the race a year later to become the first Australian rider to win the Giro.

Winners

 The "Year" column refers to the year the competition was held, and wikilinks to the article about that season.
 The "Distance" column refers to the distance over which the race was held.
 The "Margin" column refers to the margin of time or points by which the winner defeated the runner-up.
 The "Stage wins" column refers to the number of stage wins the winner had during the race.

Multiple winners
As of 2022, 22 cyclists have won the Giro d'Italia more than once.

Wins per country
Riders from sixteen countries have won the Giro d'Italia.

Footnotes

References
General
 
 

Specific

Bibliography
 
 
 
 

Giro d'Italia
 
Giro d'Italia